Amaliegade 14 is a Rococo-style building in the Frederiksstaden neighbourhood of central Copenhagen, Denmark. It was listed on the Danish registry of protected buildings and places in 1918.

History

18th century
Amaliegade 14 was built for  Anne Krieger in 1755. It was designed by Niels Eigtved, who a few years prior had also created the masterplan for the new district. In the new cadastre of 1756, it was listed as No. 61 K2. On Christian Gedde's map of St. Ann's East Quarter from 1757, it was marked as No. 318.

The property was in 756 sold to colonel Gustav Friedrich von Isenburg-Büdingen.

119th century

In 1795, Amaliegade 14 was acquired by merchant Hans Staal Hagen (17641834). Steen Andersen Bille (1751-1833), Geheimeråd and prime minister, resided in the building in 1795-1797.

Frederik Moltke, who would later serve as Privy Councillor from 1810 to 1914, lived in the building from 1799 to 1810. He was a close friend of the poet Johannes Ewald.

At the time of the 1834 census, Hans Staal Hansen resided in the ground floor with his wife, an unmarried daughter (aged 42), a granddaughter (aged 10) and three maids..

Wulff Philip Heymanm who owned the property from 1840 to 1851m was the father of Isaac and Philip Heyman. Carl Frederik Rentzmann, who owned the property from 1851 to 1858, was the father of the civil servant Peter Nicolai Rentzmann.

Steen Andersen Bille (1797-1883), a son of the earlier resident by the same name, was a resident in the building in 1857-1869.

In 1858, Amaliegade 14 was acquired by Peter Crjistian Knudtzon. He was one of the largest merchants trading o n Iceland. His widow Lucinde kept the property following her husband's death in 1864. David Baruch Adler, a merchant, banker and politician, was among her tenants from 1870 but moved when he purchased the Gustmeyer House in 1873. 

Peter and Lucinda Knudtzon's eldest son, Søren Christian Knudtzon, who had for a while worked in his father's firm, would later serve as director of the National Bank of Denmark. He owned the property from 1889 to 1913. He owned Amaliegade 14 following his mother's death in 1888.

The painter Kristian Zahrtmann had both his home and studio on the third floor from 1893. Zahrtmann had used Søren Christian Lundtzon as a model when painting his Don Juan back in 1885. He moved to a newly built house, Casa d-Antino, Mariendalsvej 79, in 1913.

On Knudtzon's death in 1913, Amaliegade 14 was sold to textile merchant Carl Lauritzen.

In 1940, Amaliegade 14 was acquired by Valerius Ragoczy. He had made a fortune in the leather industry and was also the owner of the summer residence Simdstrupøre in Rungsted. He was married to the sculptor Laura  Ragoczy. He had recently partnered with Louis H Poulsen to form Poulsen & Ragogczy, a wholesale company trading in leather and hides, which was from then on based at Amaliegade 14. The company was later continued by  Ragoczy's son, Lothar Ragoczy who for a while served as president of the Confederation of Leather Wholesalers in Denmark.

20th century
The composer Hakon Schmedes was among the residents of the building in 1010.

The Swiss Embassy was based in the building from 1929. It has later moved to Hellerup in 2015. Danish Maritime, an industry organisation for manufacturers of ships and maritime equipment, was based on the first floor from 2015 until 31 December 2017.

Architecture
The building is seven bays wide and has a three-bay median risalit. The facade is divided horizontally by a cornice between the first and second floor. Under the roof runs another cornice supported by corbels. The complex also comprises a seven bay long side wing and a five-bay rear wing.

Today
The building is owned by the property company Jeudan and used as office space. A number of companies are based in it, including Portchain.

List of owners
 (1753-1756) Justitsraadinde Anne Krieger
 (1756-1763) G. F. Ysenborg 
 (1763-1766) Frederick Charles Ferdinand, Duke of Brunswick-Lüneburg 
 (1766-1780) Etatsraad J. Pieper
 (1780-1788) Generalmajor H. Ax Ahlefeldt
 (1788-1794) Justitsraad P. Prihn 
 (1794-1795) :Hermann Abbestée 
 (1795-1846) Hans Staal Hagen 
 (1846-1849) Grosserer F. P. Sommer 
 (1849-1851) Wulff Philip Heyman
 ( 1851-1858) Carl Frederik Rentzmann
 (1858-1864) Peter Christian Knudtzon
 (1864-1889) Lucinde Knutzon
 (1889-1913) Søren Christian Knudtzon
 (1913-1916) Mannefakturhandler C. Lauritzen
 (1916-1934) Fabrikant H. N. Petersen
 (1934-1940) Grosserer F. Jørgensen
 (1940-1957) . Valerius Ragoczy
  (1957-) Poulsen & Ragogczy

See also
 Listed buildings in Copenhagen Municipality

References

External links
 Amaliegade 14 at Jeudan
 Interior from 1014
 Swiss embassy source

Frederiksstaden
Listed buildings and structures in Copenhagen
Buildings and structures in Denmark associated with the Moltke family